Admiral William John Flanagan Jr. (born March 27, 1943) is a retired United States Navy four star admiral who served as Commander in Chief, United States Atlantic Fleet from 1994 to 1996.

Early life and education
Flanagan was born in 1943 in Jesup, Georgia. In addition to his bachelor's degree in marine transportation, Flanagan received a Master of Arts degree in political science from the American University in 1974 and graduated from Harvard Business School in 1980.

Naval career
Flanagan graduated from the Massachusetts Maritime Academy in 1964 with a Bachelor of Science degree in marine transportation and an ensign's commission in the Naval Reserve, joining the Merchant Marine and working for American Export-Isbrandtsen Lines out of New York, where he achieved the grade of second mate. After three years of service with American Export Lines, Flanagan reported for active duty with the United States Navy on May 15, 1967 as a lieutenant (junior grade).

He had now advanced to the rank of captain. Flannagan commanded the guided missile destroyer—the lead ship of her class—on her first deployment to the Mediterranean Sea and the Indian Ocean.

On October 5, 1994, Flanagan was promoted to the rank of admiral and was assigned as Commander in Chief of the Atlantic Fleet. At the end of his tenure in this position, he was responsible for more than 200,000 Navy and Marine Corps personnel, 220 vessels, 1,500 aircraft, and 27 shore installations. Flanagan stepped down from commanding the Atlantic Fleet on December 20, 1996, and retired shortly thereafter after approximately thirty years of naval service.

Military awards
U.S. Military decorations

References

1943 births
Living people
People from Jesup, Georgia
Massachusetts Maritime Academy alumni
United States Navy personnel of the Vietnam War
American University alumni
Harvard Business School alumni
Recipients of the Meritorious Service Medal (United States)
Recipients of the Legion of Merit
United States Navy admirals
Recipients of the Navy Distinguished Service Medal
Recipients of the Defense Distinguished Service Medal